John or Jack Fowler may refer to:

People

 John Fowler (by 1520–c. 1575) (died c. 1575), MP
 John Fowler (Catholic scholar) (1537–1578/9), Catholic scholar and printer
 John Fowler (politician) (1756–1840), U.S. Congressman from Kentucky
 Sir John Fowler, 1st Baronet (1817–1898), British railway engineer
 John Fowler (agricultural engineer) (1826–1864), English pioneer in the use of steam engines for ploughing
 Sir John Fowler (British Army officer) (1864–1939)
 John Edgar Fowler (1866–1930), U.S. congressman from North Carolina
 Jack Fowler (footballer, born 1899) (1899–1975), Plymouth Argyle, Swansea Town and Wales international footballer
 Jack Fowler (footballer, born 1902) (1902–1979), English footballer with Bradford City and Torquay United
 John Gordon Fowler (1905–1971), United States Air Force general
 John Beresford Fowler (1906–1977), British interior designer
 John Fowler (footballer, born 1933) (1933–1976), Scottish footballer with Colchester United
 John Fowler (mayor) (born 1954), mayor of the City of South Sydney

Companies
 John Fowler & Co., a British engineering company

See also
 Sir John Fowler Leece Brunner, 2nd Baronet (1865–1929), British politician